Kakatpur is a Vidhan Sabha constituency of Puri district, Odisha. This constituency includes Konark, Kakatpur block, Astarang block and 13 Gram panchayats (Jangalbori, Birtung, Baulanga, Desthali, Dhumala, Sorava, Mahalapada, Achutapur, Banakhandi, Simmili, Sutan, Tarakora and Badagaon) of Gop block.

Elected Members

Fifteen elections were held between 1957 and 2019.
Elected members from the Kakatpur constituency are:
2019: (105): Tusharkanti Behera (BJD)
2014: (105): Surendra Sethi (BJD)
2009: (105): Rabi Mallick (BJD)
2004: (54): Surendra Nath Naik (BJD)
2000: (54): Surendra Nath Naik (BJD)
1995: (54): Baikunthanath Swain (Congress)
1990: (54): Surendra Nath Naik (Janata Dal)
1985: (54): Surendra Nath Naik (Janata Party)
1980: (54): Baikunthanath Swain (Congress-I)
1977: (54): Surendra Nath Naik (Janata Party)
1974: (54): Brundaban Patra (Congress)
1971: (50): Surendra Nath Naik (Utkal Congress)
1967: (50): Gati Krushna Swain (CPI)
1961: (94): Upendra Mohanty (Congress)
1957: (66): Bharat Das (CPI)

2019 Election Result

2014 Election Result
In 2014 election, Biju Janata Dal candidate Surendra Sethi defeated Indian National Congress candidate Rabindra Kumar Sethy by a margin of 41,030 votes.

2009 Election Result
In 2009 election, Biju Janata Dal candidate Rabi Mallick defeated Indian National Congress candidate Biswa Bhusan Das by a margin of 15,221 votes.

Notes

References

Assembly constituencies of Odisha
Puri district